The Sitkovetsky Trio is a piano trio, formed by students at the Yehudi Menuhin School in 2007, and has emerged as one of the outstanding trios of today, receiving numerous awards and critical acclaim.

Members
In 2018, the trio consisted of Alexander Sitkovetsky (violin), Leonard Elschenbroich (cello), and Wu Qian (piano). In 2019 a new cellist, the German-Korean Isang Enders, joined the group.

Awards
 First prizewinner of the International Commerzbank Chamber Music Award 2008
 Recipients of the Nordmetall Chamber Music Award at the Mecklenburg Vorpommern Festival 2009

References

External links

Musical trios
Chamber music groups
Piano trios